Gerald Kirby may refer to:

Gerald Kirby, character played by Ricardo Montez
Gerald Kirby, candidate for Ottawa Centre (provincial electoral district)

See also
 Kirby (surname)